Belle Isle State Park may refer to:
Belle Isle State Park (Michigan), formerly a Detroit city park
Belle Isle State Park (Virginia)